Nangeenan is a small townsite west of Merredin on State Route 94, in the Wheatbelt region of Western Australia (WA).

It has a local hall which has been in use since around the time of World War I. During the same era, Nangeenan was the site of a "state farm", a term used at the time for a research station of the WA Department of Agriculture.

References

Towns in Western Australia
Shire of Merredin